Lucena is a municipality in the state of Paraíba in the Northeast Region of Brazil.

See also
List of municipalities in Paraíba

References

External links

Municipalities in Paraíba
Populated places established in 1961
Populated coastal places in Paraíba